T. J. Carter may refer to:
 T. J. Carter (basketball) (born 1985), American basketball player
 T. J. Carter (defensive back) (born 1999), American football player
 T. J. Carter (defensive lineman) (born 1998), American football player
 T. J. Carter, better known as Lil Silva, English record producer, singer, songwriter and DJ